The Women's road race of the 2013 UCI Road World Championships was a cycling event that took place on 28 September 2013 in the region of Tuscany, Italy.

Qualification
Qualification was based mainly on the 2013 UCI Nation Ranking as of 15 August 2013. The first five nations in this classification qualified 7 riders to start, the next ten nations qualified 6 riders to start and the next 5 nations qualified 5 riders to start. Other nations and non ranked nations had the possibility to send 3 riders to start.

All other National Federations (3)

Moreover, the outgoing World Champion and continental champions were able to take part in the race.
 Outgoing World Champion: 
 African Champion: 
 American Champion: 
 Asian Champion: 
 European Champion: 
 Oceanian Champion:

Participating nations

141 riders from 43 nations participated in the women's road race.

  Argentina
  Australia
  Austria
  Belgium
  Belarus
  Brazil
  Canada
  Colombia
  Costa Rica
  Croatia
  Czech Republic
  Denmark
  Spain
  Finland
  France
  Great Britain
  Germany
  Hungary
  Ireland
  Israel
  Italy
  Jordan
  Japan
  Latvia
  Lithuania
  Luxembourg
  Mexico
  Mongolia
  Netherlands
  Norway
  New Zealand
  Paraguay
  Poland
  South Africa
  Russia
  Slovenia
  Serbia
  Switzerland
  Sweden
  Thailand
  Ukraine
  United States
  Venezuela

Schedule

Source

Results

Final classification

Riders who failed to finish
95 riders failed to finish the race.

References

Women's road race
UCI Road World Championships – Women's road race
2013 in women's road cycling